Kate Peterson (born 3 December 2002) is an Australian cricketer who plays for South Australia in the Women's National Cricket League (WNCL) and Sydney Sixers in the Women's Big Bash League (WBBL). An all-rounder, she bowls right-arm fast-medium and bats right-handed. Peterson joined Sydney Thunder ahead of the 2019–20 WBBL season, but had to wait until the following season to make her debut against Perth Scorchers on 4 November 2020. She did not bat or bowl in her only match for the season, which the Thunder won by 24 runs. On 18 May 2021, it was announced that she had joined South Australia ahead of the 2021–22 Women's National Cricket League season.

References

External links

2002 births
Living people
Place of birth missing (living people)
Australian women cricketers
Sydney Thunder (WBBL) cricketers
South Australian Scorpions cricketers
Sydney Sixers (WBBL) cricketers